Coniophanes taylori is a species of snake in the family Colubridae. The species is native to Mexico.

References

Coniophanes
Snakes of North America
Reptiles described in 1951
Endemic reptiles of Mexico